Ovejas is a town and municipality located in the Sucre Department, northern Colombia where the traditional Cumbia (also called Gaita) festival "Francisco Llirene" takes place in October.

References

 Gobernacion de Sucre - Ovejas
 Ovejas official website

Sucre